St. Paul's Anglican Church may refer to:

Australia 
 St Paul's Anglican Church, Cleveland, a heritage-listed church in Queensland

Canada 
 St. Paul's Anglican Church (Halifax, Nova Scotia), on the List of National Historic Sites of Canada
 St. Paul's Anglican Church (Dawson City), on the List of National Historic Sites of Canada
 St. Paul's Anglican Church (Vancouver)